During the 1980–81 English football season, Leicester City F.C. competed in the Football League First Division.

In the 1980–81 season, Leicester were in the relegation places for most of the season and were stuck in the bottom three since the beginning of November which also included only 2 wins in 16 league games from beginning of September to the end of November. Their only highlight of the season was their famous league double over Liverpool as well as inflicting Liverpool's first home defeat in 85 games on 31 January 1981 with a 2-1 win at Anfield.

In 1980, ex-player Dave Richardson joined Leicester City as Youth Team Manager, bringing paedophile, Ted Langford, from his old club to become a scout.

Final league table

Results
Leicester City's score comes first

Legend

Football League First Division

FA Cup

League Cup

Squad

References

Leicester City F.C. seasons
Leicester City